Ami Yuasa (湯浅 亜実, Yuasa Ami, born December 11, 1998), also known mononymously as Ami, is a Japanese breakdancer. She participated at the 2022 World Games in the dancesport competition where she won the gold medal in the B-Girls event.

References 

1998 births
Living people
Place of birth missing (living people)
Japanese female dancers
Breakdancers
World Games gold medalists
Competitors at the 2022 World Games
20th-century Japanese women
21st-century Japanese women
Komazawa University alumni